The 2019 Bank of America Roval 400 was a Monster Energy NASCAR Cup Series race that was held on September 29, 2019, at Charlotte Motor Speedway in Concord, North Carolina. Contested over 109 laps on the  road course, it was the 29th race of the 2019 Monster Energy NASCAR Cup Series season, the third race of the Playoffs, and final race of the Round of 16.

Report

Background

Since 2018, deviating from past NASCAR events at Charlotte, the race will utilize a road course configuration of Charlotte Motor Speedway, promoted and trademarked as the "Roval". The race will be contested over a scheduled distance of 109 laps, .

During July 2018 tests on the road course, concerns were raised over drivers "cheating" the backstretch chicane on the course. The chicanes were modified with additional tire barriers and rumble strips in order to encourage drivers to properly drive through them, and NASCAR will enforce drive-through penalties on drivers who illegally "short-cut" parts of the course. The chicanes will not be used during restarts.  In the summer of 2019, the bus stop on the backstretch was changed and deepened, becoming a permanent part of the circuit, compared to the previous year where it was improvised.

If a driver fails to legally make the backstretch bus stop, the driver must skip the frontstretch chicane and make a complete stop by the dotted line on the exit before being allowed to continue.  A driver who misses the frontstretch chicane must stop before the exit.

Entry list
 (i) denotes driver who are ineligible for series driver points.
 (R) denotes rookie driver.

First practice
Michael McDowell was replaced by Austin Cindric for the session while he was treating a kidney stone, but returned for qualifying later in the day.

Qualifying

Qualifying results

Practice (post-qualifying)

Second practice

Final practice

Race

Stage results

Stage One
Laps: 25

Stage Two
Laps: 25

Final stage results

Stage Three
Laps: 59

Cody Ware was supposed to drive No. 51 car in the race but during the Xfinity Series race, the day before, the coolbox of Cody Ware's car didn't work during the race so he felt the heat exhaustion. So J. J. Yeley was called to replace Ware in the No. 51 car in the race.

Race statistics
 Lead changes: 13 among 9 different drivers
 Cautions/Laps: 10 for 23
 Red flags: 1 for 8 minutes and 22 seconds
 Time of race: 3 hours, 20 minutes and 58 seconds
 Average speed:

Media

Television
NBC Sports covered the race on the television side. Rick Allen, Jeff Burton, Steve Letarte and Dale Earnhardt Jr. had the call in the booth for the race. Dave Burns, Marty Snider, and Kelli Stavast reported from pit lane during the race.

Radio
The Performance Racing Network, with talent and production assistant from the Indianapolis Motor Speedway Radio Network, had the radio call for the race, which was simulcast on Sirius XM NASCAR Radio. Doug Rice, Mark Garrow, and Jeff Hammond called the race from the booth when the field raced down the front straightaway. IMS Radio's Nick Yeoman was assigned the entrance to the road course and into the Bank of America bridge (Turns 1-3). Voice of the Indianapolis 500 Mark Jaynes was assigned the action from the Bank of America bridge to the middle of the infield section.  Doug Turnbull called the action exiting in infield into the oval Turn 1 banking (Turns 7-9).  Pat Patterson called the action on the backstretch and into the bus stop.  Rob Albright was assigned to the oval Turn 3-4 end. (Turns 13-15). Brad Gillie, Brett McMillan, Steve Richards, and Wendy Venturini had the call from the pit area for PRN.

Standings after the race

Manufacturers' Championship standings

Note: Only the first 16 positions are included for the driver standings.

References

Bank of America Roval 400
Bank of America Roval 400
NASCAR races at Charlotte Motor Speedway
Bank of America Roval 400